The Statue of Luke Kelly is a large marble sculpted head of Irish folk singer Luke Kelly, with metal wire for hair. The statue is located at the north end of Linear Park, near the junction of Sheriff Street Upper and Guild Street, Dublin 1.

History 
The statue, designed by Vera Klute, was unveiled along with another statue of Luke Kelly on South King Street on 30 January 2019 by President Michael D. Higgins.

It was unveiled to mark the 35th anniversary of the death of Kelly on 30 January 1984, after calls to memorialize the singer in his hometown and specifically near where Luke Kelly grew-up on Sheriff Street.

Vandalism 
The statue has been vandalised numerous times since it was commissioned. In July 2020, the 7th incident of defacement resulted in a 40-year-old man being charged with vandalism. These repeat incidents have raised questions regarding the statue's location and accessibility, which have included suggestions to relocate it to a more public area.

Design 

The statue was designed by Vera Klute and is circa 220 cm x 170 cm x 170 cm excluding the stone base. Treated marble was used for the formation of the head while treated metal wire was used to form the hair and beard. The hair is attached through the use of a metal mesh wig while the moustache is made of individual pieces of wire which were drilled into the face of the statue.

An initial model with hair was made in smaller near life sized form. A secondary larger statue was then created from plaster but without hair. This second statue was then used for 3D scanning to create the final larger sized version replicated in marble via a 5-axis cnc milling machine in Italy.

The appearance is based on a distinctive pose of Luke Kelly with his eyes closed while performing and is said to be taken from a still from his performance of Scorn Not His Simplicity on a show hosted by Jim McCann in 1974 called 'McCann Man'.

The statue is said to have cost Dublin City Council €80,000.

See also 
 List of public art in Dublin
 The Dubliners

References 

2019 sculptures
The Dubliners
Buildings and structures in Dublin (city)
Monuments and memorials in the Republic of Ireland
Outdoor sculptures in Ireland
Vandalized works of art